is a railway station in Nan'yō, Yamagata, Japan, operated by the Yamagata Railway.

Lines
Ringō Station is a station on the Flower Nagai Line, and is located 6.8 rail kilometers from the terminus of the line at Akayu Station.

Station layout
Ringō Station has a single side platform serving traffic in both directions.  The station is unattended.

Adjacent stations

History
Ringō  Station opened on 26 October 1913. The station was absorbed into the JR East network upon the privatization of JNR on 1 April 1987, and became a station on the Yamagata Railway from 25 October 1988. A new station building in the style of a log cabin was completed in July 1999.

Surrounding area
 Mogami River
  National Route 113

References

External links
  Flower Nagai Line 

Railway stations in Japan opened in 1913
Railway stations in Yamagata Prefecture
Yamagata Railway Flower Nagai Line